Aleh Ahiyevich (born 28 June 1993) is a Belarusian former professional racing cyclist. He rode at the 2015 UCI Track Cycling World Championships.

Major results
Source: 

2015
 National Road Championships
1st  Under-23 time trial
3rd Time trial
 6th Minsk Cup
2016
 3rd Time trial, National Road Championships

References

External links

1993 births
Living people
Belarusian male cyclists
Cyclists from Minsk